Dunston is a surname. Notable people with the surname include:

Bryant Dunston (born 1986), American-Armenian basketball player
John Dunston (born 1952), English headmaster
Richard Dunston, English shipbuilder
Shawon Dunston (born 1963), American baseball player